Roseospirillum parvum is a phototrophic, nonsulfur, anaerobic and motile bacterium species from the genus of Roseospirillum with a bipolar flagella which has been isolated from the Sippewissett Salt Marsh in Cape Cod in Massachusetts in the United States.

References

Further reading

External links 
Type strain of Roseospirillum parvum at BacDive -  the Bacterial Diversity Metadatabase

Rhodospirillales
Bacteria described in 2001